Locust Grove is a hamlet and former census-designated place (CDP) in the Town of Oyster Bay in Nassau County, on Long Island, in New York, United States. It is located within the CDP of Syosset, which absorbed it for the 1990 United States Census.

History 
The name Locust Grove was first used by the United States Census Bureau to define the community for the 1960 United States census.

The Locust Grove CDP was absorbed by the Syosset CDP for the 1990 United States Census.

On October 22, 1990, over 4,000 electrical customers in Locust Grove, Woodbury, and Syosset were left without electricity when an underground power cable in the hamlet was accidentally struck by construction workers. Power was restored later that day.

Geography 

Demographics 
At the time of the 1960 United States census, the population of Locust Grove was 11,558.

At the time of the 1970 United States census, the population of Locust Grove was 11,626.

At the time of the 1980 United States census, the population of Locust Grove was 9,670.

Additionally, in 1990, the Long Island Lighting Company (LILCO) estimated the total population to be 9,060, as of January 1 of that year.

References 

Former census-designated places in New York (state)
Syosset, New York